Kornelimünster/Walheim is the southernmost Stadtbezirk (borough) of Aachen, Germany, and borders the Eifel area of North Rhine-Westphalia, as well as Belgium. It became part of Aachen in 1972, after all of the communities surrounding the city were reorganized administratively.  The countryside is called Münsterländchen.

Communities 

 Kornelimünster, Administrative seat of the district, with historic town center
 Walheim, central business area of the district, and its largest community
 Friesenrath, on the border with the Eifel community of Roetgen
 Hahn, on the Inde River
 Lichtenbusch, German-Belgian border town with a border crossing for A44/E40
 Nütheim
 Oberforstbach, including an industrial park on Pascalstraße (especially for businesses specializing in information technology)
 Schleckheim
 Schmithof on the Vennbahn
 Sief, with border crossing to Raeren (Belgium)
 Eich

Pictures

Landmarks/Attractions 
 
 Kornelimünster's historic city center, with timber-framed structures on the Inde River
 former Kornelimünster Abbey, now the site of the Art of NRW, which is open to the public
 Kornelimünster Abbey gardens
 Provost Kornelimünster Church (originally from 814 to 817 AD)
 Varnenum - Excavations at Kornelimünster of a Gallo-Roman temple system
 former quarry and lime kiln in Walheim and Hahn (with posted information boards)
 Former quarry in Walheim now a large public space with playgrounds, minigolf, barbecue facilities and access to the Vennbahn path
 Historic landmark, St. Stephanus Church and cemetery
 Historic landmark, Maria in the Snow Chapel
 St. Anthony-Chapel, a small church that was destroyed in an earthquake and rebuilt in the 18th century
 Iter and Inde valley

Events 

 Historical fairground (Kornelimünster)
 Thanksgiving (Walheim)
 Carnival (Lichtenbusch/Oberforstbach)
 Open air carnival (Kornelimünster)
 Festival of stars (Schleckheim)

Twin towns and sister cities 

 Montebourg (France), a sister city of Walheim since 1960, which was carried over to the district after Kornelimünster and Walheim were merged in 1972.  Montebourg is a commune in the Manche department (Basse-Normandie) in Normandy in north-western France. It is located southeast of Cherbourg.

References

External links 
District website for Kornelimünster/Walheim
 Art of North Rhine-Westphalia

Aachen